Ruba may refer to:

People
 Máel Ruba (642–722), Irish saint
 Ruba Ghazal, Canadian politician
 Ruba Katrib, American curator
 Ruba Nadda (born 1972), Canadian film director

Places
 Ruba, Belarus
 Ruba Parish, Latvia

Food
 Ullucus, a root vegetable

Science
 Rubredoxin A, protein component of photosynthesis
 Ruba (fly), a genus of insects in the family Stratiomyidae